UFC 184: Rousey vs. Zingano was a mixed martial arts event held on February 28, 2015, at Staples Center in Los Angeles, California.

Background
A UFC Middleweight Championship bout between Chris Weidman and Vitor Belfort was expected to serve as the event headliner. The much delayed pairing was previously scheduled to take place at UFC 173 and also at UFC 181. However, on January 30, the UFC announced that Weidman had pulled out of the bout, citing an injury he sustained in training. Subsequently, a UFC Women's Bantamweight Championship bout between current champion Ronda Rousey and top contender Cat Zingano was promoted to the main event. Belfort was offered an interim title fight first against Lyoto Machida and then Gegard Mousasi as a replacement for Weidman, but he declined and stated that he would only fight for the full title.

Neil Magny was briefly linked to a bout with Josh Koscheck at the event.  However, Magny was pulled from the fight in favor of a bout with Kiichi Kunimoto at UFC Fight Night 60. Koscheck faced Jake Ellenberger instead.

A bout between touted newcomer Holly Holm and Raquel Pennington, originally booked for UFC 181 and ultimately scrapped due to Holm being injured, served as the co-headliner.

Mark Muñoz was very briefly scheduled to a bout with Caio Magalhães at the event.  However, shortly after the bout was announced by the UFC, Magalhães indicated that he would not be able to compete at the event due to a lingering infection after recent dental surgery, which would require additional surgery.  Muñoz stayed on the card and faced returning UFC veteran Roan Carneiro.

A heavyweight bout between former UFC Heavyweight champion Frank Mir and Antônio Silva, originally scheduled for the main card, was moved up a week and served as the event headliner for UFC Fight Night 61.

Ronaldo Souza was expected to face Yoel Romero at this event. However, on January 15, Souza was forced to withdraw from the bout with pneumonia. The pairing was left intact and the fight rescheduled for UFC on Fox 15.

Yancy Medeiros was slated to face Tony Ferguson at this event, but an injured foot forced him out of the bout. On the same day, Gleison Tibau was announced as his replacement.

Results

Bonus awards
The following fighters were awarded $50,000 bonuses:
Fight of the Night: None awarded
Performance of the Night: Ronda Rousey, Jake Ellenberger, Tony Ferguson and Tim Means

Reported payout
The following is the reported payout to the fighters as reported to the California State Athletic Commission. It does not include sponsor money or "locker room" bonuses often given by the UFC and also do not include the UFC's traditional "fight night" bonuses.

Ronda Rousey: $130,000 ($65,000 win bonus) def. Cat Zingano: $100,000
Holly Holm: $50,000 ($25,000 win bonus) def. Raquel Pennington: $10,000
Jake Ellenberger: $136,000 ($68,000 win bonus) def. Josh Koscheck: $78,000
Alan Jouban: $20,000 ($10,000 win bonus) def. Richard Walsh: $8,000
Tony Ferguson: $48,000 ($24,000 win bonus) def. Gleison Tibau: $50,000
Roan Carneiro: $24,000 ($12,000 win bonus) def. Mark Muñoz: $47,000
Ramon Salazar: $8,000  vs. Norifumi Yamamoto: $15,000 ^
Tim Means: $34,000 ($17,000 win bonus) def. Dhiego Lima: $10,000
Derrick Lewis: $30,000 ($15,000 win bonus) def. Ruan Potts: $10,000
Valmir Lazaro: $16,000 ($8,000 win bonus) def. James Krause: $15,000
Masio Fullen: $16,000 ($8,000 win bonus) def. Alexander Torres: $8,000

^ Both fighters earned show money; bout declared No Contest.

See also
List of UFC events
2015 in UFC

References

Mixed martial arts in Los Angeles
2015 in mixed martial arts
Ultimate Fighting Championship events
Sports competitions in California
February 2015 sports events in the United States
Events in Los Angeles